Galleria Vik Milano is a luxury hotel in Milan, Italy. Located inside Galleria Vittorio Emanuele II, it opened as Galleria Vik in 2019 after being acquired by the Vik Retreats group.

History
The hotel is located in the historical center of Milan and housed within the Galleria Vittorio Emanuele II. Originally designed in 1861 by Giuseppe Mengoni and built between 1865 and 1877, the Galleria is named after the first King of Italy, Vittorio Emanuele II. The five-story structure features two-glass vaulted arcades and a massive central dome connecting the Piazza del Duomo to Piazza della Scala.

Previously known as TownHouse Galleria it was "one of the few hotels to officially hold a seven-star rating—for a couple of years"  until 2011 when the rating was no longer used. It had formerly been called the Seven Stars Galleria. In 2017, the (then) 46-room hotel began offering 24-karat gold bedsheets for the Seven Stars Octagon Presidential Suite - a set was described as sold for US$293,878, while the suite was €5,492.70 a night.

In 2019, the Vik Retreats group bought the hotel alongside the Seven Stars hotel in Milan both for $18 million, and turned the TownHouse Galleria into the Gallery Vik.

References

Hotels in Milan
Hotels established in 2007